Finland participated at the Eurovision Song Contest 1990 held in Zagreb, Yugoslavia.

The Finnish entry was Beat with the Swedish language song "Fri?", the first time the Finnish entry had been sung in Swedish. After that the only other time Finland has participated with a song in Swedish was in 2012 with Pernilla Karlsson singing "När jag blundar".

Before Eurovision

National final 
The final was held on 17 February 1990 at the Kulttuuritalo in Helsinki, hosted by Kati Bergman. 11 songs took part and the winner was chosen by an expert jury. This would be Ossi Runne's last participation
as a conductor for the pre-selections in 24 years. He would hand over his baton to his successor, Olli Ahvenlahti, as he would conduct at Zagreb

At Eurovision 
Beat performed last of 22, following Cyprus. At the close of the voting they had received 8 points, placing joint last with Norway.

Voting

References

External links
Finnish National Final 1990

1990
Countries in the Eurovision Song Contest 1990
Eurovision